Robert W Floyd (June 8, 1936 – September 25, 2001) was a computer scientist. His contributions include the design of the Floyd–Warshall algorithm (independently of Stephen Warshall), which efficiently finds all shortest paths in a graph and his work on parsing; Floyd's cycle-finding algorithm for detecting cycles in a sequence was attributed to him as well. In one isolated paper he introduced the important concept of error diffusion for rendering images, also called Floyd–Steinberg dithering (though he distinguished dithering from diffusion). He pioneered in the field of program verification using logical assertions with the 1967 paper Assigning Meanings to Programs. This was a contribution to what later became Hoare logic. Floyd received the Turing Award in 1978.

Life 
Born in New York City, Floyd finished high school at age 14. At the University of Chicago, he received a Bachelor of Arts (B.A.) in liberal arts in 1953 (when still only 17) and a second bachelor's degree in physics in 1958. Floyd was a college roommate of Carl Sagan.

Floyd became a staff member of the Armour Research Foundation (now IIT Research Institute) at Illinois Institute of Technology in the 1950s. Becoming a computer operator in the early 1960s, he began publishing many papers, including on compilers (particularly parsing). He was appointed an associate professor at Carnegie Mellon University by the time he was 27 and became a full professor at Stanford University six years later. He obtained this position without a Doctor of Philosophy (Ph.D.) degree.

He was a member of the International Federation for Information Processing (IFIP) IFIP Working Group 2.1 on Algorithmic Languages and Calculi, which specified, maintains, and supports the programming languages ALGOL 60 and ALGOL 68.

He was elected a Fellow of the American Academy of Arts and Sciences in 1974.

He received the Turing Award in 1978 "for having a clear influence on methodologies for the creation of efficient and reliable software, and for helping to found the following important subfields of computer science: the theory of parsing, the semantics of programming languages, automatic program verification, automatic program synthesis, and analysis of algorithms".

Floyd worked closely with Donald Knuth, in particular as the major reviewer for Knuth's seminal book The Art of Computer Programming, and is the person most cited in that work. He was co-author, with Richard Beigel, of the textbook The Language of Machines: an Introduction to Computability and Formal Languages. Floyd supervised seven Ph.D. graduates.

Floyd married and divorced twice, first with Jana M. Mason and then computer scientist Christiane Floyd, and he had four children. In his last years he suffered from Pick's disease, a neurodegenerative disease, and thus retired early in 1994.

His hobbies included hiking, and he was an avid backgammon player:

Selected publications

Notes

Further reading

External links

 Obituary in the Stanford Report
 

1936 births
2001 deaths
American computer scientists
Turing Award laureates
Fellows of the American Academy of Arts and Sciences
Fellows of the Association for Computing Machinery
Formal methods people
University of Chicago alumni
Stanford University School of Engineering faculty